The popularity of yoga as exercise has led to the creation of hybrid activities combining the practice of yoga asanas with other forms of exercise, the use of animals including dogs and horses, and other types of recreation.

With other exercise forms

 with acrobatics (Acroyoga), 2003
 using a silk hammock, (aerial yoga), 2014
 with barre work (as in ballet preparation), by 2017
 with boxing, by 2018
 with Capoeira, by 2017
 with cardio, by 2017
 with Chinese Medicine, 1986
 with CrossFit, 2013
 with cycling, 2013
 with high-intensity interval training, by 2017
 with hiking, 2012
 with Hip-Hop, by 2017
 with martial arts, by 2019
 with Pilates (Yogalates), 2000
 with paddleboards (paddle board yoga), 2013
 with rafting, by 2017
 with resistance training, by 2017
 with Rolfing, by 2017
 with slacklining, by 2017
 with snowshoeing (Snowga), 2017

 with suspension training, by 2017
 with trampolining, 2013
 with tribal dance (Buti yoga), by 2017
 in water (Aqua Yoga), by 2017
 with weight training, by 2019

With animals

 with cats, 2017
 with dogs (Doga), 2003
 with goats, 2018
 horseback yoga, 2017
 with ring-tailed lemurs, 2019

With other things

 Beer yoga, 2014
 with Buddhism's mindfulness meditation (Mindful yoga), 1990
 Naked yoga, 1938
 with psychotherapy, 2009

References

Yoga as exercise